The Van Dyke Show is an American sitcom starring Dick Van Dyke and his son Barry Van Dyke which aired on CBS from October 26 to December 7, 1988. The series marked the second time the real-life father-son actors worked together, after Dick guest-starred in a 4th season episode of Airwolf with Barry as the leading man.

Synopsis
The series centers on Matt Burgess (Barry Van Dyke), who runs a small regional theater in Pennsylvania, and his father Dick Burgess (Dick Van Dyke), a Broadway musical star. Dick decided to give up Broadway to live and work with his son at the theater. The theater's staff included Doc, the stage manager, Jillian, Matt's secretary, and Eric, Matt's helper.

Cast
 Dick Van Dyke as Dick Burgess
 Barry Van Dyke as Matt Burgess
 Kari Lizer as Chris Burgess
 Billy O'Sullivan as Noah Burgess
 Whitman Mayo as Doc Sterling
 Maura Tierney as Jillian Ryan
 Paul Scherrer as Eric Olander

Guest stars
 Lainie Kazan
 Lee Paul

Reception and cancellation
The series was generally panned by critics and failed to generate sufficient ratings. CBS announced the series' cancellation on December 14, 1988, one week after the sixth episode aired. The remaining four episodes of the ten produced were never aired.

Episodes

References

External links 

1988 American television series debuts
1988 American television series endings
1980s American sitcoms
CBS original programming
English-language television shows
Television shows set in Pennsylvania
Van Dyke family
Dick Van Dyke